Shyline Dambamuromo (born 4 April 2000) is a Zimbabwean footballer who plays as a midfielder for Faith Drive Queens FC and the Zimbabwe women's national team.

Club career
Dambamuromo played for Faith Drive in Zimbabwe.

International career
Dambamuromo capped for Zimbabwe at senior level during two COSAFA Women's Championship editions (2020 and 2021).

References

2000 births
Living people
Zimbabwean women's footballers
Women's association football midfielders
Zimbabwe women's international footballers